CGV Cinemas Indonesia (formerly blitzmegaplex and CGV Blitz from 2015–2017) is a movie theater chain in Indonesia. Founded in December 2013, the chain consists of seven locations that each feature a minimum of eight screens. Despite with the controversy evolved with the Korean movie theater chain CJ CGV, the cinema chain was later renamed as CGV Blitz.

History 
BlitzMegaplex opened its first location in Paris Van Java, Bandung, Indonesia on 16 October 2006. Seven further locations have been built, including Bekasi Cyber Park, which was opened on 3 June 2011. In September 2012, BlitzMegaplex opened its first location outside Java in Plaza Balikpapan. It was also the first location which using brand Blitz Theater, follows with other locations such as Kepri Mall, Harbour Bay, and Grand Galaxy Park.

Then Korean movie theater chain CJ CGV, bought BlitzMegaplex through Blitz's IPO, which is out of laws. It was then rebranded to CGV Blitz in Q4 2014. Its first location with brand CGV Blitz was Miko Mall, Bandung. In August 2015, it was then rebranded all of its locations into CGV Cinemas.

In 2018, Blitz Theater Grand Galaxy Park was replaced by Flix Cinema, another cinema chain by Agung Sedayu Group. In February 2020, its location in Mall of Indonesia was replaced too by Flix Cinema, as both malls are owned by Agung Sedayu Group, the same company which owns Flix Cinema. Due to COVID-19 pandemic, its location in Kepri Mall is closed until now. And two other locations: Harbour Bay and Daya Grand Square is closed due to both malls have ceased.

Concept 
According to its website, the CGV cinema chain is based on four "defining characteristics":
 A minimum of 8 screens per location, each equipped with high-quality cinema technology.
 A wide variety of movie options, whereby world cinema, festival and arthouse productions, Hollywood blockbusters, Indonesian movies, Hindi movies, and Anime and Asian cinema movies are screened in addition to features such as live music performances, karaoke and billiard/pool room are offered to patrons.
 Adoption of a "beyond movies" concept, meaning that additional 
 "Innovative and creative promotions and quality services" for the retention of customers.

Special Audi

Gold Class 
Gold Class is the best comfort and convenience movie watching experience. With maximum customer service, premium, and private feeling in cinema. The facility of Gold Class include full reclining seat, foot rest, blanket and amenities. Currently, Gold Class is available in:

 CGV Grand Indonesia, Jakarta
 CGV Pacific Place, Jakarta
 CGV Bella Terra, Jakarta
 CGV Aeon Mall JGC, Jakarta
 CGV Teras Kota, Tangerang
 CGV 23 Paskal, Bandung
 CGV Focal Point, Medan
 CGV Park Avenue, Batam

Velvet Class 
Velvet Class is the first sofa bed concept in cinemas in Indonesia. The facility of Velvet Class include sofa bed, pillow, blanket and amenities. Currently, Velvet Class is available in:

 CGV Grand Indonesia, Jakarta
 CGV Pacific Place, Jakarta
 CGV Central Park, Jakarta
 CGV Aeon Mall JGC, Jakarta
 CGV Paris Van Java, Bandung
 CGV 23 Paskal, Bandung
 CGV Technomart, Karawang
 CGV Hartono Mall, Yogyakarta
 CGV Park Avenue, Batam
 CGV Social Market, Palembang
 CGV Plaza Balikpapan, Balikpapan
 CGV Grand Kawanua, Manado

Satin Class 
Satin Class is the comfort of Gold Class without breaking your wallet. An affordable premium experience. The facility of Satin Class include back reclining seat and USB charging port. Currently, Satin Class is available in:

 CGV Central Park, Jakarta
 CGV Transmart Cempaka Putih, Jakarta
 CGV fX Sudirman, Jakarta
 CGV Poins Mall, Jakarta
 CGV Mall Ciputra, Tangerang
 CGV Paradise Serpong City, Tangerang
 CGV Metro Indah Mall, Bandung
 CGV Technomart, Karawang
 CGV Malang City Point, Malang
 CGV Palembang Trade Center, Palembang
 CGV Grand Batam Mall, Batam
 CGV Plaza Mulia, Samarinda
 CGV Panakkukang Square, Makassar

Sweetbox 
Sweetbox is a new feature specially designed for two persons with comfortable and spacious chair. Unlike other special auditoriums, Sweetbox seats are attached in several regular auditorium in CGV.

Starium 
Starium is a big screen cinemas with a scale that overwhelms all senses with maximum viewing angle screen, amazingly vivid picture quality with 4K super high resolution video, and heart pounding 16 channel sound. Currently, Starium is available in:

 CGV Grand Indonesia, Jakarta
 CGV Bella Terra, Jakarta
 CGV Ecoplaza Cikupa, Tangerang
 CGV Vivo Sentul, Bogor
 CGV 23 Paskal, Bandung
 CGV Hartono Mall, Yogyakarta

Sphere X 
Sphere X is the best cinematic technology in screen, sound, and seat. Enjoy the immersive curve screen in a layback chair and feel the effect of showering sound system. Currently, Sphere X is available in:

 CGV Hartono Mall, Yogyakarta
 CGV Marvell City, Surabaya

4DX 
4DX is a special auditorium for experience five senses, where you can feel various environment effects with movie accordingly to the scene. Beyond simply watching a movie, audience can experience as if they are the main character in the movie, and the 4DX effect that maximizes the vividness of each scene allows them to be more immersed in the movie. The five senses in 4DX are: wind, water, lighting, motion, and scents. Currently, 4DX is available in:

 CGV Grand Indonesia, Jakarta
 CGV Central Park, Jakarta
 CGV Paris Van Java, Bandung
 CGV Hartono Mall, Yogyakarta
 CGV Marvell City, Surabaya

Screen X 
Screen X is the world's first multi-projection auditorium that provides maximum immersion beyond the boundaries of the screen. Beyond the screen to becomes space with 3 sided screen. Currently, Screen X is only available in CGV Grand Indonesia, Jakarta.

Private Box 
Private Box is a state of the art beautiful spaces meticulously designed for the audience with exclusive movie viewing from the private space up to 4 persons. Private Box has a sophisticated interior with comfy seats, an eye-pleasing theater designed to enjoy movie differently. Also provide variety of tasty food and beverage of the audience favorable meals with a pleasant F&B service. Private Box is only available in CGV Grand Indonesia, Jakarta.

Locations 
The CGV Cinemas theater locations are:

Opening Soon

 Citra Maja Raya, Lebak, Banten
 Depok Town Center, Depok, West Java
 Cimahi Mall, Cimahi, West Java
 Queen City, Semarang, Central Java
 Palur Plaza, Karanganyar, Central Java
 Sawojajar, Malang, East Java

References

External links 
 Official Website
 Ticketing

Cinemas and movie theaters in Indonesia
CJ Group subsidiaries
CJ CGV